George Jones ( 19 July 1930 - June 2017) was a Welsh former professional footballer who played as a wing-half. He made over 100 appearances in the English Football League for Welsh club Wrexham in the 1950s.

References

1930 births
2017 deaths
Welsh footballers
Association football wing halves
Wrexham A.F.C. players
Oswestry Town F.C. players
English Football League players